Jeffrey Alan Hubbell is an American molecular engineer. During his early career, Hubbell founded three companies based on his academic research and was the holder of 88 U.S. patents.

Early life and education
Hubbell was born to father Ron Hubbell in Overland Park, Kansas. He received his bachelor's degree from Kansas State University and his PhD from Rice University in chemical engineering.

Career
Upon completing his PhD, Hubbell joined the faculty at Switzerland's École Polytechnique Fédérale de Lausanne where he served as the founding director of the Institute of Bioengineering. In 1995, Hubbell was elected a fellow of the American Institute for Medical and Biological Engineering for his "fundamental and clinically-applied contributions to biomaterials." During his early career, he founded three companies based on his academic research and was the holder of 88 U.S. patents. Hubbell remained in Switzerland until 2014 when he accepted a position at the University of Chicago faculty of engineering as their Barry L. MacLean Professor for Molecular Engineering Innovation and Enterprise. He was also elected a fellow of the National Academy of Inventors.

Upon joining the University of Chicago, Hubbell collaborated with Cathryn Nagler to establish the ClostraBio, a company to develop drugs. By 2017, Hubbel was the recipient of the Society for Biomaterials’ Founders Award for his "long-term, landmark contributions to the discipline of biomaterials." He was specifically recognized for designing materials to assemble and function so they could stimulate the immune system to fight infection or malignancy and coining the term "immuno-modulatory materials." In the same year, Hubbel was awarded the Acta Biomaterialia Gold Medal and appointed the inaugural Bell Professor in Tissue Engineering at the University of Chicago.

In 2018, Hubbell was also elected a Member of the National Academy of Medicine for his work "pioneering the development of cell responsive (bioactive) materials and inventing biomaterials that are now widely utilized in regenerative medicine." Following this, he helped develop a new system for delivering a malaria vaccine.

During the COVID-19 pandemic, Hubbell and Melody Swartz co-launched the Chicago Immunoengineering Innovation Center to develop new technologies to treat diseases, including cancer, autoimmune disorders, and COVID-19. Throughout the pandemic, the researchers at the center began developing computational and experimental approaches to new vaccines and vaccine delivery methods. In April 2020, Hubbell, Swartz, and Jun Ishihara co-published their research on an immunotherapy delivery system that finds tumors by seeking out and binding to the tumors’ collagen. Following this development, he helped design a new therapy to assist those with multiple sclerosis by fusing a cytokine to a blood protein. Later, in 2021, Hubbell was one of eight University of Chicago faculty members elected to the American Academy of Arts and Sciences.

Personal life
Hubbell married speech pathologist Juliet Boege in 1983.

References

External links

Living people
Engineers from Kansas
University of Chicago faculty
Kansas State University alumni
Rice University alumni
Members of the National Academy of Medicine
Fellows of the American Academy of Arts and Sciences
Fellows of the American Institute for Medical and Biological Engineering
Fellows of the National Academy of Inventors
People from Overland Park, Kansas
Year of birth missing (living people)
Presidents of Society for Biomaterials
20th-century American engineers
21st-century American engineers